Alexia Betiana Moyano (born 15 February 1982) is an Argentine actress.

Early life 
Born in Comandante Luis Piedrabuena, province of Santa Cruz, Argentina, Moyano lived there until she was 16 years old. In 1998 she moved to Buenos Aires and attended the University of Buenos Aires where she began her interest in theatre, training with Virginia Lago.

Her first theatre role was Maria Josefa in a school production of The House of Bernarda Alba, directed by Sebastian Kalhat and Marcela Bidegain.  In 2005 she graduated with honors from the University of Buenos Aires with a Bachelor’s in Business Administration.  By the time she graduated she had dedicated her life to theatre.

Career 
Moyano continued her acting training with Helena Tritek and performed in commercials, music videos and short films. In theatre, she acted in Cielo rojo, Un guapo del 900, Cremona, La niña y el leñador, and Crónicas.

From 2009-10 Moyano earned a postgraduate diploma in classical acting from LAMDA, and trained with Complicite in Commedia Dell’Arte with Marcello Magni.

Moyano returned to Buenos Aires and co-starred as Pilar in Filosofia de vida, directed by Javier Daulte and starring Alfredo Alcón, Claudia Lapacó, Rodolfo Bebán, and Marco Antonio Caponi. For her work in Filosofia de vida, she was nominated for the Premios ACE Award for Revelation Actress.  In film, she appeared in Extraños en la noche (directed by Alejandro Montiel), Verdades verdaderas (directed by Nicolás Gil Lavedra), La cacería (directed by Carlos Orgambide), and Tiempos menos modernos (directed by Simon Franco).  In television she appeared as Pucca in the miniseries Babylon, directed by Gaston Portal.

From 2012-13 Moyano studied at the Conservatoire National Supérieur d'Art Dramatique.

In 2014 Moyano acted at the Teatro Nacional Cervantes in Bisnietas, directed by Julia Calvo. In 2015 she starred in The Irish Prisoner (original title: El prisionero irlandés) (directed by Carlos Juareguialzo and Marcelo Silva y Nasute), on television in Milagros en Campaña, and in theatre as the title role in Agatha.

Filmography

Film

Television

Theatre

Awards and nominations

References

External links

Actresses from Buenos Aires
Living people
1982 births